Veterans' health care in the United States is separated geographically into 19 regions (numbered 1, 2, 4–10, 12 and 15–23)  known as VISNs, or Veterans Integrated Service Networks, into systems within each network headed by medical centers, and hierarchically within each system by division level of care or type. This article lists VA  VISN facilities by region, location, and type.

VA medical facilities and Vet Centers are run by the Veterans Health Administration of the United States Department of Veterans Affairs. Vet Centers focus on post-war adjustment, counseling and outreach services for veterans and their families. There are currently 152 VA Medical Centers and approximately 1,400 community-based outpatient clinics in the US. Facilities types (level of care types) are listed in the VISN tables below as:
Network System Headquarters (HQ)
Network Health Care System (HCS)
VA medical centers (VAMC)
Division (Inpatient/Outpatient) (DIVIO)
Domiciliary Care (DOM)
Outpatient Clinic (OPC)
Community Based Outpatient Clinic (CBOC)
VA Independent Outpatient Clinic (IOC)
VA/DoD Joint Venture Site (VADOD)
Vet Center (VC)
Mobile Vet Center (MVC)
VA Outreach Clinic (ORC)
VA Rehabilitation Center (REHAB)
Community Service Program (CSP)

VISNs 1 through 23

VISN Regions

VISN 1: VA New England Healthcare System
Headquarters: Bedford, Massachusetts

VISN 2: VA NY/NJ Veterans Healthcare Network
Headquarters: Bronx, New York
(note: Formerly VISNs 2&3)

VISN 4: VA Healthcare - VISN 4
Headquarters: Pittsburgh, Pennsylvania

VISN 5: VA Capitol Health Care Network
Headquarters: Linthicum, Maryland

VISN 6: VA Mid-Atlantic Health Care Network
Headquarters: Durham, North Carolina

VISN 7: VA Southeast Network
Headquarters: Duluth, Georgia

VISN 8: VA Sunshine Healthcare Network
Headquarters: Saint Petersburg, Florida

VISN 9: VA Mid South Healthcare Network
Headquarters: Nashville, Tennessee

VISN 10: VA Healthcare System 
Headquarters: Cincinnati, Ohio
(note: Formerly VISN's 10 & 11)

VISN 12: VA Great Lakes Health Care System
Headquarters: Hines, Illinois

VISN 13 & 14 (merged to 23)
VISN 13 & 14 merged into VISN 23.

VISN 15: VA Heartland Health Care Network
Headquarters: Kansas City, Missouri

VISN 16: VA South Central Health Care Network
Headquarters: Ridgeland, Mississippi

VISN 17: VA Heart of Texas Health Care Network
Headquarters: Arlington, Texas

VISN 18: VA Southwest Health Care Network
Headquarters: Mesa, Arizona

VISN 19: VA Rocky Mountain Network
Headquarters: Glendale, Colorado

VISN 20: VA Northwest Network
Headquarters: Vancouver, Washington

VISN 21: VA Sierra Pacific Network
Headquarters: Mare Island, California

VISN 22: VA Desert Pacific Healthcare Network
Headquarters: Long Beach, California

VISN 23: VA Midwest Health Care Network
Headquarters: Minneapolis, Minnesota and Lincoln, Nebraska

List of Veterans Affairs medical facilities by state
 in

References

External links
 
Veteran Health Administration directory. U.S. Department of Veterans Affairs.

Veterans
Medical facilities List of Veterans Affairs